The Montehermosan age is a period of geologic time (6.8–4.0 Ma) within the Miocene and Pliocene epochs of the Neogene used more specifically with South American Land Mammal Ages. It follows the Huayquerian and precedes the Chapadmalalan age.

References 

 
Miocene life
Miocene South America
Zanclean
Neogene animals of South America